Martin Løfqvist Bernburg (born 26 December 1985) is a Danish former professional footballer who played as a striker. He previously notably played for FC Nordsjælland and Brøndby IF and also gained caps for the Danish national team.

Club career

FC Copenhagen
Born in Amager, Copenhagen, he was the top scorer some seasons in a row for F.C. Copenhagens youth team; he played alongside the likes of other Copenhagen talents William Kvist, Lasse Quist, Jeppe Brandrup, Thomas Villadsen, Morten Bertolt, and Nicklas Svendsen signed senior contracts and was subsequently moved to the first team squad. All being considered great talents, and all being parts of the national youth teams, only William Kvist managed to become a regular.

Appearing only seven times for F.C. Copenhagen with his league debut coming on 13 August 2006 in a game where he played the first 54 minutes of the Superliga match against Odense BK at Parken Stadium. He only played because Marcus Allbäck had a small injury.

In FC Copenhagen, the road to first team football was long behind the likes of Marcus Allbäck, Fredrik Berglund and Alvaro Santos. As a consequence of this, he transferred to FC Nordsjælland where he instantly became a success.

FC Nordsjælland
Coming to FC Nordsjælland from F.C. Copenhagen, he was supposed to fill the hole that the departure of Morten Nordstrand to F.C. Copenhagen had left. Being physically stronger than Nordstrand, he quickly became an important player scoring in more than every other match. His strong performances had him linked with a move to both FC Midtjylland and Brøndby IF and later FC Utrecht expressed interest in him. His strong performances also earned him a call-up for the Danish national team, however he didn't make his debut at this time.

Alongside Hertha BSC FC Nordsjælland participated in the 2008–09 UEFA Cup on a UEFA Fair-Play quota. In their first qualification round, they draw Estonian TVMK Tallinn, where FC Nordsjælland proceeded 8–0 on aggregate score

Scottish club Queen of the South from Dumfries were drawn in the second qualification round. FC Nordsjælland won the first game 1–2. In the second match, Bob Harris had Queens in the lead from a well worked free-kick after 2 minutes. With Queen pushing for the critical second goal, with 5 minutes remaining two goals by Bernburg put the tie beyond Queens.

Brøndby IF
On 18 August 2009, Brøndby IF signed Bernburg on a five-year contract for an undisclosed fee. Bernburg was plagued with injuries since his transfer; he only made 49 league appearances for Brøndby, scoring four goals. 

A few years after ending his career, he criticised the medical treatment he received in Brøndby after the dismissal of head coach Kent Nielsen and discussed mental health problems in professional football.

Tårnby FF
Bernburg was forced to end his professional career due to persistent knee injuries and retired in January 2014. On 6 July 2015, however, he signed with amateur side Tårnby FF. He stopped definitively after two years in Tårnby.

International career

Denmark
As a result of an injury to Morten "Duncan" Rasmussen he on 2008-03-24 received a call-up to the Danish national team alongside Mikkel Thygesen who was replacing Martin Jørgensen. Bernburg who at the moment was suffering from jumper's knee had to be replaced by Morten Nordstrand.

On 2008-08-20 he received his second call-up, this time for a match against Spain, however, he spent the entire match on the bench as Denmark succumbed to a 3–0 loss.

On 2008-09-03 he was called up as a safety net to Nicklas Bendtner and Jon Dahl Tomasson who both suffered from minor injuries, for the matches against Hungary and Portugal in Denmark's 2010 FIFA World Cup qualification. Against Hungary, he spent the entire match on the bench. Against Portugal, however, he came in with 10 minutes to go in the game, when the score was 2–1 in Portugal's favour. He helped the Danish team to a sensational 2–3 win, earning him his first national cap.

Coaching career 
On 21 January 2014, Bernburg was named assistant coach of Brøndby IF U19 team.

After studying between 2015 and 2018, Bernburg worked as a mental coach at the academy of FC Helsingør in 2018. On 29 September 2021, Bernburg was hired as a mental coach at the academy of Nykøbing FC.

Outside football 
After ending his career, Bernburg studied a Bachelor of Science (BSc) in Exercise and Sport Sciences and continued on MSc level after receiving his diploma. In 2021, he finished his Master's degree in Humanities and Social Sciences Sports Science.

Notes

References

External links 
 Danish national team profile
 Official Danish Superliga stats

1985 births
Living people
Danish men's footballers
Denmark international footballers
Denmark under-21 international footballers
Boldklubben af 1893 players
F.C. Copenhagen players
FC Nordsjælland players
Brøndby IF players
Tårnby FF players
Danish Superliga players
Association football forwards
Fremad Amager players